Kultintern was an international organisation set up to enable the Russian Proletkult organisation to work with an international network of contacts alongside the Comintern. Its goal was to spread "proletarian culture". It was first proposed in an issue of Gorn, publication of Proletkult, during the First Congress of the Communist International, March 1919, but practical steps were only taken during the Second Congress of the Communist International.

Provisional International Bureau 

This was set up on 12 August 1920 following the Comintern Congress. The president was Anatoly Lunacharsky and the General Secretary Pavel Lebedev-Polianskii. The Bureau included several international delegates:
Executive Committee
 Wilhelm Herzog (Germany)
 Jules Humbert-Droz (Switzerland)
 Nicola Bombacci (Italy)
 William McLaine (Great Britain)
 Raymond Lefebvre (France)
Others
 Max Barthel (Germany)
 John Reed (USA)
 Tom Quelch (Great Britain) 
 Karl Toman (Austria)
 War Van Overstraeten (Belgium)
 Haavard Langseth (Norway)
 Walther Bringolf (Switzerland)

Criticism 
Leo Pasvolsky was one of the first people to criticise the formation of Kultintern. First he portrayed the movement as generally exhibiting a heavy monotony with poetry which was both facile and pretentious. However he further claimed that the foundation of Kultintern would reduce the Proletkult movement "not primarily, but exclusively" to a weapon to promote the Bolshevik view of communism.

See also
 Akasztott Ember, a Hungarian avant-garde arts magazine which advocated "the formation of an "International Cultural Revolutionary Internationale  to be realised through the Proletkult network" in 1922.

References 

International cultural organizations
Organizations established in 1920
Comintern